The 2010–11 season in Hong Kong football, starting July 2010 and ending June 2011.

Overview
 In July 2010, Birmingham City F.C. played an exhibition match in Hong Kong.
 22 January 2011: Ng Wai Chiu returned to Hong Kong First Division League and joined South China.

Representative team

Hong Kong

Friendly matches in first half season

Match Detail

2011 Guangdong–Hong Kong Cup

Match Detail

Match Detail

Friendly matches in second half season

Hong Kong U-23

Friendly against Australia

Match Detail

Long Teng Cup

This is a tournament was organized by Chinese Taipei Football Association and take place in Kaohsiung, Taiwan from 8 to 12 October 2010. Another three participating teams is Chinese Taipei, the Philippines and Macau. The players of Hong Kong were selected for 2010 Asian Games and another three associations sent their senior teams. FIFA ensured that these 3 matches are the formal international matches after the tournament.

The first match of Hong Kong team was against the Philippines on 8 October. However, the heavy rain flooded the field, so the ball flow on the water and could not be kick. The match was abandoned at 14th-minute. The rematch played on 9 October, Hong Kong defeated the Philippines by 4–2.

Match Detail

Match Detail

Match Detail

Match Detail

Friendly for Asian Games

Match Detail

2010 Asian Games
The 2010 Asian Games will play between 7 November and 27 November in Guangzhou, China.

Match Detail

Match Detail

Match Detail

Match Detail

Hong Kong U-15

U-15 EAFF Championship
Hong Kong national under-15 football team won all the group stage matches in the championship, which hold in Guam. Hong Kong beat Chinese Taipei in semi-final but lose by one goal in the final against North Korea. Hong Kong was awarded runners' up in the tournament.

Exhibition matches

Xtep Cup

Canon Cup

References